Francesco Bovini was an Italian painter who was active in Ferrara. He painted two altarpieces for the church of the Oratorio della Penitenza in Ferrara, one representing the Immaculate Conception and the other, the Adoration of the Magi.

References

Painters from Ferrara
Year of death unknown
Year of birth unknown